Ummulisani is an extinct genus of bothremydid pleurodiran turtle that was discovered in the Eocene of Morocco. The genus consists solely of type species U. rutgersensis.

Ummulisani was discovered in the Mrah Iaresh locality, Morocco, which dates to the Ypresian stage of the Eocene. The holotype consists of a skull, lacking the palate, and is curated in the American Museum of Natural History. Two other skulls are known, both also from the Ypresian of Morocco.
This turtle is notable for the hornlike protuberances on its prefrontal bones, which may have played a role in burrowing or in mating battles.

References 

Bothremydidae
Ypresian life
Prehistoric turtle genera
Eocene turtles
Eocene reptiles of Africa
Fossils of Morocco
Fossil taxa described in 2006
Monotypic turtle genera